The dusky seaside sparrow (Ammospiza maritima nigrescens) was a non-migratory subspecies of the seaside sparrow, found in Florida in the natural salt marshes of Merritt Island and along the St. Johns River. The last definite known individual died on Walt Disney World's Discovery Island in 1987, and the subspecies was officially declared extinct in December 1990.

Origin 
The dusky seaside sparrow was first categorized as a species in 1873, after its discovery on March 17, 1872, by Charles Johnson Maynard. Its dark coloration and distinct song, which is introduced by a buzz rather than the discrete clicks heard in Ammospiza maritima mirabilis and has been described as "insect-like" by ornithologist William Post, distinguish it as a subspecies from other seaside sparrows. Found in the marshes of Florida's Atlantic Coast on Merritt Island and the upper St. Johns River, the dusky seaside sparrow was geographically isolated from other seaside sparrows. It was categorized as a subspecies in 1873. Even though the dusky's mitochondrial DNA is the same as the mitochondrial DNA of other seaside sparrow populations, DNA testing by itself does not demonstrate that its subspecies classification is undeserving. In 1981, only five dusky seaside sparrows remained, all being males. Conservation efforts were made by trying to breed the remaining duskies with Scott's seaside sparrows in order to create half dusky hybrid offspring. "Unfortunately, although the Fish and Wildlife Service initially supported the crossbreeding program, it withdrew its support due to Interior's hybrid policy". Due to only the males being left, even though duskies could be crossbred with other seaside sparrows, there would never be another pure dusky seaside sparrow again.

Species divergence 

Based on comparisons between mtDNA of the dusky seaside sparrow and its close relative, Scott's seaside sparrow, John Avise and William Nelson were able to estimate the last time that the dusky sparrow and the seaside sparrow came in contact.  Since it has been established that the dusky sparrow had a very small inhabited locale, it was isolated from other sparrows for a very long time. Assuming that the mtDNA in sparrows evolves at the rate which is estimated for mammals and other birds (approximately 2–4% every million years), then the last time the dusky sparrow was in contact with Scott's seaside sparrow was approximately 250,000–500,000 years ago, giving plenty of time for the dusky sparrow to establish differences between other varieties of species, such as its unique plumage and call.

Causes for extinction 
 

Dusky seaside sparrow populations probably declined during the 1940s, 1950s and 1960s, temporally linked to the applications of DDT pesticide on Merritt Island to control mosquitoes and, after 1956, to the creation of mosquito impoundments that caused loss of salt marsh.  When Merritt Island was flooded with the goal of reducing the mosquito population around the Kennedy Space Center, the sparrows' nesting grounds were devastated, and their numbers plummeted. Later, the marshes surrounding the river were drained to facilitate highway construction along with the sugar and oil industries; this was a further blow. Eventually, pollution and pesticides took such a high toll that by 1979, only six dusky seaside sparrows were known to exist, all of whom were males; a female was last sighted in 1975.

Last specimens 
Captive breeding of all remaining dusky seaside sparrows with the Scott's seaside sparrow (A. m. peninsulae) from Florida's gulf coast was approved in 1979. By 1980 five dusky seaside sparrows were in a captive breeding facility in Gainesville, Florida. One, banded in 1978 with an orange leg band, was unique.

"Orange Band" was left by himself on the St. Johns Unit of the St. Johns NWR after a yellow-leg-banded dusky was captured in 1979. Field observations of color banded sparrows from 1975 to 1979 indicated that dusky seaside sparrows seldom traveled more than a mile or two in their lifetimes. In April 1980, "Orange Band" was again observed on the St. Johns Unit, but was surprisingly captured in June eight miles south on the Beeline Unit in the company of a dusky with a green leg band. Before finding "Green Band", "Orange Band" passed the general vicinity of the two unbanded dusky seaside sparrows.

In 1983 the last four living dusky seaside sparrows were taken to the Walt Disney World Resort, to continue crossbreeding and living out their days in a protected habitat on the Discovery Island nature reserve. By March 31, 1986, only "Orange Band" remained.

Despite being blind in one eye, "Orange Band" reached an extreme old age for a sparrow, living at least nine years, and possibly as many as thirteen, before being found dead on June 16, 1987.  Its heart and liver were cryopreserved.

After the death of the final "pure" dusky sparrow, the breeding program was discontinued due to the fact that it was thought the hybrids that exist could not reproduce to create dusky sparrows, since they did not share the proper mtDNA that dusky sparrows possess. However, research done on a similar species known as Passerella iliaca, or the fox sparrow,  was able to show that some subspecies of one plumage group had the plumage of another despite having the "wrong" mtDNA type.  This potentially meant that if the breeding program was continued with the dusky sparrow hybrids, sparrows with the same color plumage as the dusky sparrows would eventually be produced. Unfortunately, shortly after the breeding program was halted, the remaining hybrid sparrows either died or escaped captivity, leading to the final extinction of the taxon.

"Green Band" proved elusive, and was never recaptured after having been banded.  He was last seen on July 23, 1980.

Footnotes

References

External links 

Earth Witness Community — dusky seaside sparrow
History of the Merritt Island National Wildlife Refuge
Florida Bird Sounds — contains a sound of dusky seaside sparrow and other birds of Florida.

Ammospiza
Species made extinct by human activities
Extinct animals of the United States
Extinct birds of North America
Bird extinctions since 1500
Birds described in 1873
Taxa named by Robert Ridgway